Saridjah Niung, also known as Ibu Soed or Mrs. Soed (26 March 1908 – 12 December 1993) was a Chinese-Indonesian musician, teacher, radio announcer, playwright and batik artist. She composed music for children as well as patriotic hymns. During the Dutch colonial years, she composed music about the Japanese occupation and Indonesia’s independence. She also wrote the Indonesian patriotic hymns "" ("My Homeland") and "Berkibarlah Benderaku" ("Fly, My Flag").

On 26 March 2017, Google celebrated her 109th birthday with a Google Doodle.

References 

1908 births
1993 deaths
Indonesian musicians